Kriangkrai Noikoed (born October 6, 1975 in Bangkok) is a Thai taekwondo practitioner, who competed in the men's welterweight category. He claimed a bronze medal in the 70-kg division at the 1998 Asian Games in his native Bangkok, retrieved three men's welterweight titles at the Southeast Asian Games (1999, 2001, and 2003), and later represented his nation Thailand at the 2004 Summer Olympics.

Noikoed qualified for the Thai squad in the men's welterweight class (80 kg) at the 2004 Summer Olympics in Athens, by defeating Filipino taekwondo player Donald Geisler for the top spot and securing a berth from the Asian Olympic Qualifying Tournament in his native Bangkok. He crashed out early in a cautious 12–16 defeat to Iranian fighter and eventual bronze medalist Yousef Karami during his opening round match. When Karami lost the semifinal to U.S. taekwondo player and 2000 Olympic champion Steven López, Noikoed denied his chance to proceed into the repechage for the Olympic bronze medal.

References

External links

1975 births
Living people
Kriangkrai Noikoed
Kriangkrai Noikoed
Taekwondo practitioners at the 2004 Summer Olympics
Taekwondo practitioners at the 1998 Asian Games
Kriangkrai Noikoed
Asian Games medalists in taekwondo
Kriangkrai Noikoed
Medalists at the 1998 Asian Games
Southeast Asian Games medalists in taekwondo
Kriangkrai Noikoed
Competitors at the 1999 Southeast Asian Games
Competitors at the 2001 Southeast Asian Games
Competitors at the 2003 Southeast Asian Games
Kriangkrai Noikoed
Martial arts trainers